This is a list of Danish association football players:

A
 Kim Aabech
 Johan Absalonsen
 Daniel Agger
 Nicolaj Agger
 Muhammed Akinci
 Martin Albrechtsen
 Steffen Algreen
 Iddi Alkhag
 Erik Bo Andersen
 Henrik Andersen
 Jesper Andersen
 Søren Andersen
 Stephan Andersen
 Thomas Andie
 Casper Ankergren
 Lasse Ankjær
 Frank Arnesen
 Jens Berthel Askou
 Thomas Augustinussen
 Yasin Avcı

B
 Kristian Bak Nielsen
 Ronni Bagge
 Ruben Bagger
 Ulrik Balling
 Jesper Bech
 Tommy Bechmann
 Mikkel Beck
 Nicklas Bendtner
 Martin Bergvold
 Martin Bernburg
 Mathias Bersang Sørensen
 Jacob Berthelsen
 Morten Bertolt
 Mikkel Bischoff
 Martin Borre
 Jonas Borring
 Martin Braithwaite
 Jeppe Brandrup
 Kenneth Brylle Larsen
 Simon Bræmer

C
 Dennis Cagara
 Kim Christensen (born 1979, goalkeeper)
 Kim Christensen (born 1980, forward)
 René Christensen
 Søren Christensen
 Jesper Christiansen (forward)
 Jesper Christiansen (goalkeeper)
 Peter Christiansen
 Søren Colding
 Jeppe Curth
 Morten Cramer

D
 Thomas Dalgaard
 Kaspar Dalgas
 Rebekka Danielsen
 Kim Daugaard
 Rasmus Daugaard
 Peter Degn
 Willads Delvin

E
 Ronnie Ekelund
 Preben Elkjær
 Thomas Enevoldsen
 Steffen Ernemann

F
 Jamil Fearrington
 Christian Flindt Bjerg
 Dennis Flinta
 Per Frandsen
 Thomas Frandsen
 Carsten Fredgaard
 Søren Friis
 Viktor Fischer

G
 Thomas Gaardsøe
 Per Gade
 Benny Gall
 Jakob Glerup
 Bjarne Goldbæk
 Thomas Gravesen
 Michael Gravgaard
 Rasmus Grønborg Hansen
 Jesper Grønkjær
 Thomas Guldborg Christensen
 Peter Graulund

H
 Martin Halle
 Esben Hansen
 Frank Hansen
 Jesper Hansen
 Michael Hansen
 Nikolaj Hansen
 Rasmus Hansen
 Lasse Heinze
 Martin Heinze
 Thomas Helveg
 Casper Henningsen
 René Henriksen
 Jan Hoffmann
 Lars Høgh
 Nicolai Høgh
 Steffen Højer
 Søren Holdgaard
 Lasse Holmgaard
 Thorbjørn Holst Rasmussen
 Nikolaj Hust
 Dennis Høegh

I
 Mads Ibenfeldt

J
 Anders Post Jacobsen
 Casper Jacobsen
 Lars Jacobsen
 Michael Jakobsen
 Claus Jensen
 Daniel Jensen (defender)
 Daniel Jensen (midfielder)
 Jonas Jensen
 Lars Jensen
 Martin S. Jensen
 Mike Jensen
 Søren Jensen
 Leon Jessen
 Søren Jochumsen
 Karsten Johansen
 Ulrik Johansen
 Jesper Jørgensen
 Mads Jørgensen
 Martin Jørgensen
 Nicolai Jørgensen

K
 Klaus Kærgård
 Thomas Kahlenberg
 Morten Karlsen
 Steffen Kielstrup
 Henrik Kildentoft
 Kristian Kirk
 Kasper Klausen
 Thomas Kortegaard
 Bjørn Kristensen
 Frank Kristensen
 Kim Kristensen
 Patrick Kristensen
 Thomas Kristensen
 Jan Kristiansen
 Søren Krogh
 Per Krøldrup
 Lasse Kronborg
 William Kvist

L
 Jesper Lange
 Lars Larsen
 Michael Larsen
 Brian Laudrup
 Finn Laudrup
 Michael Laudrup
 Martin Laursen
 Ulrik Laursen
 Rajko Lekic
 Anders Lindegaard
 Ulrik Lindkvist
 Thomas Lindrup
 Niels Lodberg
 Kasper Lorentzen
 Peter Løvenkrands
 Tommy Løvenkrands
 Jerry Lucena
 Mathias Lykke Hansen

M
 Claus Madsen
 Rasmus Marvits
 Jesper Mikkelsen
 Patrick Mtiliga
 Jan Mølby
 Peter Møller
 Anders Møller Christensen
 Kenneth Møller Pedersen
 Simon Makienok (born 1990, striker)

N
 Simon Nagel
 Allan Nielsen
 Brian Nielsen
 David Nielsen
 Jesper Nielsen
 Jimmy Nielsen
 Kent Nielsen
 Lars Christian Nielsen
 Lasse Nielsen
 Per Nielsen
 Peter Nielsen
 Anders Nøhr
 Morten Nordstrand
 Alex Nørlund
 Hjalte Nørregaard
 Peter Nymann

O
 Allan Olesen
 Allan Arenfeldt Olesen
 Jacob Olesen
 Jesper Olesen
 Christian Olsen
 Danny Olsen
 Kenni Olsen
 Kim Olsen
 Lars Olsen
 Marc Olsen
 Morten Olsen
 Martin Ørnskov Nielsen

P
 Søren Pallesen
 Henrik Pedersen
 Martin Pedersen (defender)
 Simon Azoulay Pedersen
 Søren Pedersen
 René Petersen
 Stephan Petersen
 Kenneth Perez
 Sladan Peric
 Christian Poulsen
 Christopher Poulsen
 Jakob Poulsen
 Simon Poulsen
 Brian Priske

Q
 Lasse Qvist
 Ole Qvist

R
 Nick Ragus
 Mikkel Rask
 Anders Rasmussen
 David Rasmussen
 Morten "Duncan" Rasmussen (striker)
 Morten Rasmussen (defender)
 Steffen Rasmussen
 Theis F. Rasmussen
 Thomas Rasmussen
 Thomas Raun
 Martin Retov
 Michael Ribers
 Jonathan Richter
 Simon Richter
 Søren Rieks
 Mads Rieper
 Kasper Risgård
 Thomas Røll
 Dennis Rommedahl
 Thomas Rytter

S
 Ebbe Sand
 John Sandberg
 Mathias Sauer
 Kasper Schmeichel
 Peter Schmeichel
 Stefan Schmidt
 Ronnie Schwartz
 Thomas Seidelin
 Asbjørn Sennels
 Michael Silberbauer
 Christian Sivebæk
 Morten Skoubo
 Henrik Smedegaard
 Martin Spelmann
 Allan Søgaard
 Chris Sørensen
 Dennis Sørensen
 Jacob Sørensen
 Jan Sørensen
 Jens-Kristian Sørensen
 Kenneth Sørensen
 Thomas Sørensen
 Kris Stadsgaard
 Kenneth Stenild
 Kevin Stuhr Ellegaard
 Sebastian Svärd
 Bo Svensson

T
 Thomas Tengstedt
 Dan Thomassen
 Mikkel Thygesen
 Mads Timm
 Henrik Toft
 Stig Tøfting
 Jon Dahl Tomasson
 Mads Toppel
 Michael Tørnes
 Mads Torry
 Christian Traoré
 Magnus Troest

U
Mikael Uhre
Kaj Uldaler
Iørn Uldbjerg
Einer Ulrich

V
 Mikkel Vendelbo
 Søren Ulrik Vestergaard
 Thomas Villadsen
 Martin Vingaard
 Ulrich Vinzents

W
 Morten Wieghorst
 Lars Winde
 Rasmus Würtz

Y
Sammy Youssouf

Z
 Niki Zimling
 Bora Zivkovic

 
Denmark
Footballers

Association football player non-biographical articles